Cryptolechia microglyptis is a moth in the family Depressariidae. It was described by Edward Meyrick in 1936. It is found in Venezuela.

References

Moths described in 1936
Cryptolechia (moth)
Taxa named by Edward Meyrick